Kyaunggon is a town in the Ayeyarwady Region of south-west Myanmar. It is the seat of the Kyaunggon Township in the Pathein District.

Populated places in Ayeyarwady Region
Township capitals of Myanmar